Jonas Bybjerg Lössl (born 1 February 1989) is a Danish professional footballer who plays as a goalkeeper for Danish Superliga club Midtjylland, and the Denmark national team.

After beginning his professional career with Midtjylland, he played in France for Guingamp, in Germany for Mainz 05, and in England for Huddersfield Town and Everton. In 2021, he returned to Midtjylland.

Lössl made his senior international debut for Denmark in March 2016 and was part of their squad at the 2018 FIFA World Cup and 2020 UEFA Euro.

Personal life
One of Lössl's grandparents is of German descent. For this reason, his surname is written with "ö" instead of the "ø" which is otherwise the normal spelling of this letter in the Danish language.

Club career

Midtjylland
A product of the Midtjylland football academy, Lössl made his Danish Superliga debut with Midtjylland in March 2010. He played a total number of 137 matches for the club.

Guingamp
On 5 June 2014, FC Midtjylland reported that they had sold Lössl to French football club, Guingamp. After initially starting his first season as a backup keeper at the club, Lössl eventually established himself as the club's first-choice keeper in his two seasons at the club.

Mainz 05
On 16 June 2016, it was reported that Lössl was making a move to German club Mainz 05. The club cited that they intended Lössl to be the instant replacement for the club's previous keeper, Loris Karius, who himself had just transferred to Liverpool.

Huddersfield Town and Everton
After one season at Mainz, Lössl signed for Huddersfield Town on a season-loan on 30 June 2017. On 12 August 2017, Lössl made his debut for Huddersfield in a 3–0 win against Crystal Palace.

In March 2018, following a successful loan spell in which he kept 10 Premier League clean sheets, Huddersfield activated a clause in Lössl's loan deal from Mainz, and signed him permanently for an undisclosed fee.

Following Huddersfield Town's relegation from the Premier League in 2019, Lössl joined fellow English club Everton on a free transfer on 1 July 2019. Completely unused, he returned to Huddersfield on loan on 31 January 2020 for the rest of the Championship season.

On 1 February 2021, Lössl left Everton to return to Denmark to sign with Midtjylland.

Return to Midtjylland

On 1 February 2021, following his departure from Everton, Lössl re-signed with his first professional club, Midtjylland. There, he took over after former starter Jesper Hansen, but eventually saw himself benched in favour of Elías Rafn Ólafsson after returning from injury under new head coach Bo Henriksen during the 2021–22 season.

Loan to Brentford 
On 31 December 2021, Lössl signed for Premier League club Brentford on loan, effective from 1 January 2022. An option to make the deal permanent was included in the six-month loan deal.

International career
Lössl played 22 games for various Danish national youth teams, including 15 games for the Denmark under-21 national football team. He was first called up to the senior Denmark squad in June 2015.

On 29 March 2016, Lössl made his Denmark debut as a half-time substitute for Kasper Schmeichel in a 1–0 friendly loss to Scotland, keeping a clean sheet in his 45 minutes.  Lössl was included in Denmark's squad for the 2018 FIFA World Cup in Russia, but did not play in the tournament.

Career statistics

Club

International

References

External links

Profile at the FC Midtjylland website
National team profile

1989 births
Living people
People from Kolding
Association football goalkeepers
Danish men's footballers
Danish people of German descent
Denmark youth international footballers
Denmark under-21 international footballers
Denmark international footballers
Kolding IF players
FC Midtjylland players
En Avant Guingamp players
1. FSV Mainz 05 players
Huddersfield Town A.F.C. players
Everton F.C. players
Brentford F.C. players
Danish Superliga players
Ligue 1 players
Bundesliga players
Premier League players
2018 FIFA World Cup players
UEFA Euro 2020 players
Danish expatriate men's footballers
Danish expatriate sportspeople in France
Expatriate footballers in France
Danish expatriate sportspeople in Germany
Expatriate footballers in Germany
Danish expatriate sportspeople in England
Expatriate footballers in England
Sportspeople from the Region of Southern Denmark